Blair County Convention Center is a convention center located just south of Altoona, Pennsylvania. It has two floor levels with the exhibit floor and ballroom on separate levels. Rocco Alianiello is the Executive Director and COO. The facility is near the Interstate 99 and Route 36.

Facility
The conference center has a 24,000 square foot exhibit hall, 11 break-out rooms, full-service banquet facilities and themed cafes, multiple sunset patios, and a business resource center.

References

Buildings and structures in Blair County, Pennsylvania
Convention centers in Pennsylvania
2001 establishments in Pennsylvania